The 1895 Auburn Tigers football team represented Auburn University (then known as Agricultural and Mechanical College of Alabama) in the 1895 Southern Intercollegiate Athletic Association football season. It was the Tigers' fourth overall season and they competed as a member of the Southern Intercollegiate Athletic Association (SIAA). The team was led by head coach John Heisman, in his first year and finished with a record of two wins and one loss (2–1).

Schedule

Trick play
The team executed a "hidden ball trick" in the game against Vanderbilt as Auburn seemed to run a revolving wedge. Vanderbilt still won however, 9 to 6; the first time in the history of southern football that a field goal decided a game. "Billy" Williams recalled:

Quarterback Reynolds Tichenor described the nature of the play as follows:

The Tigers again used the play against Georgia. Georgia coach Pop Warner later used the trick in 1897 while at Cornell against Penn State; and again and most famously in 1903 while at Carlisle against Harvard, attracting national attention in a close loss.

References

Auburn
Auburn Tigers football seasons
Auburn Tigers football